Dmitry Vyacheslavovich Trunenkov (born 19 April 1984) is a Russian bobsledder who has competed since the early 2000s.

Career
He won the silver medal in the four-man event at the 2008 FIBT World Championships in Altenberg, Germany. He won a gold medal at the 2009 Bobsleigh European Championship in St. Moritz, Switzerland and three European silver medals, all in the four-man event.

Trunenkov originally took up sprinting whilst at university before switching to bobsleigh at the age of 21.

At the 2010 Winter Olympics, Trunenkov crashed during the four-man event.

Trunenkov has a degree in industrial and civil construction from Krasnoyarsk State Academy of Architecture and Construction, which became part of the Siberian Federal University in 2006. He holds the title of Merited Master of Sport in Russia. He is married to Elena and they have a daughter, Dana.

On 31 January 2017, the Russian Anti-Doping Agency announced that Trunenkov had been banned for four years from April 2016 due to a doping violation.

Trunenkov was part of a four-man Russian team who originally won gold at the 2014 Winter Olympics but was then disqualified and stripped of medals because Alexandr Zubkov tested positive for doping. On 27 November 2017, Trunenkov was found guilty in anti-doping rule violations, disqualified and declared ineligible for future Olympic games.

On 1 February 2018, the CAS removed the sanctions from Alexey Negodaylo and Dmitry Trunenkov in bobsleigh, but upheld them on their teammates Alexandr Zubkov and Alexey Voyevoda.

References

External links
 
 Bobsleigh four-man world championship medalists since 1930

1984 births
Bobsledders at the 2010 Winter Olympics
Bobsledders at the 2014 Winter Olympics
Living people
Olympic bobsledders of Russia
Sportspeople from Krasnoyarsk
Russian male bobsledders
Russian sportspeople in doping cases
Doping cases in bobsleigh
Competitors stripped of Winter Olympics medals